Lake Elmo Airport  is a public airport located just outside the city of Lake Elmo in Washington County, Minnesota, United States, about 12 miles east of the central business district of St. Paul.  Although most airports in the United States use the same three-letter location identifier for the FAA and International Air Transport Association (IATA), this airport is assigned 21D by the FAA but has no designation from the IATA or ICAO. It is also home to a Civil Air Patrol squadron.

It is included in the Federal Aviation Administration (FAA) National Plan of Integrated Airport Systems for 2021–2025 in which it is categorized as a regional general aviation facility.

History 
During World War II the airfield was used by the United States Army Air Forces.

Facilities and aircraft 
It has two asphalt runways; 14/32 is 3,500 by 75 feet , and 4/22 is 3,500 by 75 feet .

For the 12-month period ending July 31, 2019, the airport had 26,498 aircraft operations, an average of 73 per day: 95% general aviation, 4% air taxi, and 1% military.
In August 2022, there were 169 aircraft based at this airport: 162 single-engine, 4 multi-engine, and 3 helicopter.

Superfund Site
The Lake Elmo Airport is connected to the contamination at the Baytown Township Ground Water Plume Superfund site. The site is listed due to trichloroethylene contamination of a groundwater aquifer used for local drinking water supplies.

See also
 Minnesota World War II Army Airfields

References

External links 
Baytown Township Ground Water Plume EPA Factsheet
  

Airports in Minnesota
Airfields of the United States Army Air Forces in Minnesota
Transportation buildings and structures in Washington County, Minnesota
Superfund sites in Minnesota